Francesco Casati (1620 – 16 October 1702) was a Roman Catholic prelate who served as Titular Archbishop of Trapezus (1670–1702).

Biography
Francesco Casati was born in 1620 in Plaisance. On 2 June 1670, he was appointed during the papacy of Pope Clement X as Titular Archbishop of Trapezus. On 15 June 1670, he was consecrated bishop by Rinaldo d'Este, Cardinal-Priest of Santa Pudenziana, with Francesco Maria Febei, Titular Archbishop of Tarsus, and Vincenzo Candiotti, Bishop of Bagnoregio, serving as co-consecrators. He served as Titular Archbishop of Trapezus until his death on 16 October 1702.

Episcopal succession

References

17th-century Roman Catholic titular bishops
18th-century Roman Catholic titular bishops
Bishops appointed by Pope Clement X
1620 births
1702 deaths